Phineas P. Gage (18231860) was an American railroad construction foreman remembered for his improbable survival of an accident in which a large iron rod was driven completely through his head, destroying much of his brain's left frontal lobe, and for that injury's reported effects on his personality and behavior over the remaining 12 years of his lifeeffects sufficiently profound that friends saw him (for a time at least) as "no longer Gage".

Gage is a fixture in the curricula of neurology, psychology, and neuroscience, one of "the great medical curiosities of all time" and "a living part of the medical folklore" frequently mentioned in books and scientific papers; he even has a minor place in popular culture. Despite this celebrity, the body of established fact about Gage and what he was like (whether before or after his injury) is small, which has allowed "the fitting of almost any theory [desired] to the small number of facts we have"Gage acting as a "Rorschach inkblot" in which proponents of various conflicting theories of the brain all saw support for their views. Historically, published accounts of Gage (including scientific ones) have almost always severely exaggerated and distorted his behavioral changes, frequently contradicting the known facts.

A report of Gage's physical and mental condition shortly before his death implies that his most serious mental changes were temporary, so that in later life he was far more functional, and socially far better adapted, than in the years immediately following his accident. A social recovery hypothesis suggests that his work as a stagecoach driver in Chile fostered this recovery by providing daily structure that allowed him to regain lost social and personal skills.

Life

Background

Gage was the first of five children born to Jesse Eaton Gage and Hannah Trussell (Swetland) Gage of Grafton County, New Hampshire. Little is known about his upbringing and education beyond that he was literate.

Physician John Martyn Harlow, who knew Gage before his accident, described him as "a perfectly healthy, strong and active young man, twenty-five years of age, nervo-bilious temperament, five feet six inches [] in height, average weight one hundred and fifty pounds [], possessing an iron will as well as an iron frame; muscular system unusually well developedhaving had scarcely a day's illness from his childhood to the date of [his] injury". (In the pseudoscience of phrenology, which was then just ending its vogue, nervo-bilious denoted an unusual combination of "excitable and active mental powers" with "energy and strength [of] mind and body [making] possible the endurance of great mental and physical labor".)

Gage may have first worked with explosives on farms as a youth, or in nearby mines and quarries. In July 1848 he was employed on construction of the Hudson River Railroad near Cortlandt Town, New York, and by September he was a blasting foreman (possibly an independent contractor) on railway construction projects. His employers' "most efficient and capable foreman ... a shrewd, smart business man, very energetic and persistent in executing all his plans of operation", he had even commissioned a custom-made tamping irona large iron rodfor use in setting explosive charges.

Accident

As Gage was doing this around 4:30 p.m., his attention was attracted by his men working behind him.
Looking over his right shoulder, and  bringing his head into line with the blast hole and tamping iron, Gage opened his mouth to speak; in that same instant the tamping iron sparked against the rock and (possibly because the sand had been omitted) the powder exploded. Continuing upward outside the upper jaw and possibly fracturing the cheekbone, it passed behind the left eye, through the left side of the brain, then completely out the top of the skull through the frontal bone.

Despite 19th-century references to Gage as the "American Crowbar Case", his tamping iron did not have the bend or claw  with the term crowbar; rather, it was simply a pointed cylinder something like a javelin, round and fairly smooth:

Gage was thrown onto his back and gave some brief convulsions of the arms and legs, but spoke within a few minutes, walked with little assistance, and sat upright in an oxcart for the  ride to his lodgings in town.
(A possibly apocryphal contemporary newspaper report claimed that Gage, while en route, made an entry in his time-bookthe record of his crew's hours and wages.)
About 30 minutes after the accident, physician Edward H. Williams found Gage sitting in a chair outside the hotel and was greeted with "one of the great understatements of medical history":

Harlow took charge of the case around 6 p.m.:

Gage was also swallowing blood, which he regurgitated every 15 or 20 minutes.

Treatment and convalescence

With Williams' assistance Harlow shaved the scalp around the region of the tamping iron's exit, then removed coagulated blood, small bone fragments, and "an ounce or more" of protruding brain. After probing for foreign bodies and replacing two large detached pieces of bone, Harlow closed the wound with adhesive straps, leaving it partially open for drainage; the entrance wound in the cheek was bandaged only loosely, for the same reason. A wet compress was applied, then a nightcap, then further bandaging to secure these dressings. Harlow also dressed Gage's hands and forearms (which along with his face had been deeply burned) and ordered that Gage's head be kept elevated.

Late that evening Harlow noted: "Mind clear. Constant agitation of his legs, being alternately retracted and extended... Says he 'does not care to see his friends, as he shall be at work in a few days.

Despite his own optimism, Gage's convalescence was long, difficult, and uneven. Though recognizing his mother and unclesummoned from Lebanon, New Hampshire, 30 miles (50km) away on the morning after the accident, on the second day, he "lost control of his mind, and became decidedly delirious". By the fourth day, he was again "rational ... knows his friends", and after a week's further improvement Harlow entertained, for the first time, the thought "that it was possible for Gage to recover ... This improvement, however, was of short duration."

Beginning 12 days after the accident, Gage was semi-comatose, "seldom speaking unless spoken to, and then answering only in monosyllables", and on the 13th day Harlow noted, "Failing strength ... coma deepened; the globe of the left eye became more protuberant, with ["fungus"deteriorated, infected tissue] pushing out rapidly from the internal canthus [as well as] from the wounded brain, and coming out at the top of the head." By the 14th day, "The exhalations from the mouth and head [are] horribly fetid. Comatose, but will answer in monosyllables if aroused. Will not take nourishment unless strongly urged. The friends and attendants are in hourly expectancy of his death, and have his coffin and clothes in readiness."

Galvanized to action, Harlow "cut off the fungi which were sprouting out from the top of the brain and filling the opening, and made free application of caustic [i.e. crystalline silver nitrate] to them. ("Gage was lucky to encounter Dr. Harlow when he did", writes Barker. "Few doctors in 1848 would have had the experience with cerebral abscess with which Harlow left  and which probably saved Gage's life." See § Factors favoring Gage's survival, below.)

On the 24th day, Gage "succeeded in raising himself up, and took one step to his chair". One month later, he was walking "up and down stairs, and about the house, into the piazza", and while Harlow was absent for a week Gage was "in the street every day except Sunday", his desire to return to his family in New Hampshire being "uncontrollable by his friends ... he went without an overcoat and with thin boots; got wet feet and a chill".  He soon developed a fever, but by mid-November was "feeling better in every respect [and] walking about the house again". Harlow's prognosis at this point: Gage "appears to be in a way of recovering, if he can be controlled".

By November 25 (10 weeks after his injury), Gage was strong enough to return to his parents' home in Lebanon, New Hampshire, traveling there in a "close carriage" (an enclosed conveyance of the kind used for transporting the insane). Though "quite feeble and thin ... weak and childish" on arriving, by late December he was "riding out, improving both mentally and physically", and by February 1849 he was "able to do a little work about the horses and barn, feeding the cattle etc. [and] as the time for ploughing came [i.e. about May or June] he was able to do half a day's work after that and bore it well". In August his mother told an inquiring physician that his memory seemed somewhat impaired, though slightly enough that a stranger would not notice.

Injuries

In April 1849, Gage returned to Cavendish and visited Harlow, who noted at that time loss of vision, and ptosis, of the left eye, a large scar on the forehead (from Harlow's draining of the abscess) and

Gage's rearmost left upper molar, adjacent to the point of entry through the cheek, was also lost.
Though a year later some weakness remained, Harlow wrote that "physically, the recovery was quite complete during the four years immediately succeeding the injury".

New England and New York (18491852)

 the Professor of Surgery at Harvard Medical School, brought Gage to Boston for several weeks and, after satisfying himself that the tamping iron had actually passed through Gage's head, presented him to a meeting of the Boston Society for Medical Improvement and (possibly) to the medical school class.

Unable to reclaim his railroad job  Gage was for a time "a kind of living museum exhibit" at Barnum's American Museum in New York City. (This was not the later Barnum's circus; there is no evidence Gage ever exhibited with a troupe or circus, or on a fairground.) Advertisements have also been found for public appearances by Gagewhich he may have arranged and promoted himselfin New Hampshire and Vermont, supporting Harlow's statement that Gage made public appearances in "most of the larger New England towns". (Years later Bigelow wrote that Gage had been "a shrewd and intelligent man and quite disposed to do anything of that sort to turn an honest penny", but gave up such efforts because "[that] sort of thing has not much interest for the general public".)
For about 18 months, he worked for the owner of a stable and coach service in Hanover, New Hampshire.

Chile and California (18521860)

In August 1852, Gage was invited to Chile to work as a long-distance stagecoach driver there, "caring for horses, and often driving a coach heavily laden and drawn by six horses" on the ValparaísoSantiago route. After his health began to fail in mid-1859, he left Chile for San Francisco, arriving (in his mother's words) "in a feeble condition, having failed very much since he left New Hampshire ... Had many ill turns while in Valparaiso, especially during the last year, and suffered much from hardship and exposure." In San Francisco he recovered under the care of his mother and sister, who had relocated there from New Hampshire around the time he went to Chile. Then, "anxious to work", he found employment with a farmer in Santa Clara.

In February 1860, Gage began to have epileptic seizures. He lost his job, and (wrote Harlow) as the seizures increased in frequency and severity he "continued to work in various places [though he] could not do much".

Death and exhumation

On May 18, 1860, Gage "left Santa Clara and went home to his mother. At 5 o'clock, A.M., on the 20th, he had a severe . The family physician was called in, and bled him. The  were repeated frequently during the  day and night," and he died in status , in or near San Francisco,
late on May 21, 1860. He was buried in San Francisco's Lone Mountain Cemetery.

 all trace of [Gage], and had well nigh abandoned all  of ever hearing from him again") somehow learned that Gage had died in California, and made contact with his family there. At Harlow's request the family had Gage's skull exhumed, then personally delivered it to Harlow, who was by then a prominent physician,  and civic leader in Woburn, Massachusetts.

About a year after the accident, Gage had given his tamping iron to Harvard Medical School's Warren Anatomical Museum, but he later reclaimed it and made what he called "my iron bar" his "constant companion during the remainder of his life";
now it too was delivered by Gage's family to Harlow. (Though some accounts assert that Gage's iron had been buried with him, there is no evidence for this.) After studying them for a triumphal 1868 retrospective paper on Gage Harlow redeposited the ironthis time with the skullin the Warren Museum, where they remain on display today.

The tamping iron bears the following inscription, commissioned by Bigelow in conjunction with the iron's original deposit in the Museum (though the date given for the accident is one day off):

The date Jan 6 1850 falls within the period during which Gage was in Boston under Bigelow's observation.

In 1940 Gage's headless remains were moved to Cypress Lawn Memorial Park as part of a mandated relocation of San Francisco's cemeteries to outside city limits .

Mental changes and brain damage

Gage may have been the first case to suggest the brain's role in determining personality and that damage to specific parts of the brain might induce specific personality changes, but the nature, extent, and duration of these changes have been difficult to establish. Only a handful of sources give direct information on what Gage was like (either before or after the accident), the mental changes published after his death were much more dramatic than anything reported while he was alive, and few sources are explicit about the periods of Gage's life to which their various descriptions of him (which vary widely in their implied level of functional impairment) are meant to apply.

Early observations (1849–1852)

Harlow ("virtually our only source of information" on Gage, according to psychologist Malcolm Macmillan) described the pre-accident Gage as hard-working, responsible, and "a great favorite" with the men in his charge, his employers having regarded him as "the most efficient and capable foreman in their employ"; he also took pains to note that Gage's memory and general intelligence seemed unimpaired after the accident, outside of the delirium exhibited in the first few days. Nonetheless these same employers, after Gage's accident, "considered the change in his mind so marked that they could not give him his place again":

This description ("now routinely quoted", says Kotowicz) is from Harlow's observations set down soon after the accident, but Harlowperhaps hesitant to describe his patient negatively while he was still alivedelayed publishing it until 1868, after Gage had died and his family had supplied "what we so much desired to see" (as Harlow termed Gage's skull).

In the interim, Harlow's 1848 report, published just as Gage was emerging from his convalescence, merely hinted at psychological symptoms:

But after Bigelow termed Gage "quite recovered in faculties of body and mind" with only "inconsiderable disturbance of function", a rejoinder in the American Phrenological Journal

was apparently based on information anonymously supplied by Harlow. Pointing out that Bigelow gave extensive verbatim quotations from Harlow's 1848 papers, yet omitted Harlow's promise to follow up with details of Gage's "mental manifestations", Barker explains Bigelow's and Harlow's contradictory evaluations (less than a year apart) by differences in their educational backgrounds, in particular their attitudes toward cerebral localization (the idea that different regions of the brain are specialized for different functions) and phrenology (the nineteenth-century pseudoscience that held that talents and personality can be inferred from the shape of a person's skull):

A reluctance to ascribe a biological basis to "higher mental functions" (functionssuch as language, personality, and moral judgmentbeyond the merely sensory and motor) may have been a further reason Bigelow discounted the behavioral changes in Gage which Harlow had noted.

Later observations (18581859)

In 1860, an American physician who had known Gage in Chile in 1858 and 1859 described him as still "engaged in stage driving [and] in the enjoyment of good health, with no impairment whatever of his mental faculties". Together with the fact that Gage was hired by his employer in advance, in New England, to become part of the new coaching enterprise in Chile, this implies that Gage's most serious mental changes had been temporary, so that the "fitful, irreverent ... capricious and vacillating" Gage described by Harlow immediately after the accident became, over time, far more functional and far better adapted socially.

Macmillan writes that this conclusion is reinforced by the responsibilities and challenges associated with stagecoach work such as that done by Gage in Chile, including the requirement that drivers "be reliable, resourceful, and possess great endurance. But above all, they had to have the kind of personality that enabled them to get on well with their passengers." A day's work for Gage meant "a 13-hour journey over 100 miles [160km] of poor roads, often in times of political instability or frank revolution. All thisin a land to whose language and customs Phineas arrived an utter strangermilitates as much against permanent disinhibition [i.e. an inability to plan and self-regulate] as do the extremely complex sensory-motor and cognitive skills required of a coach driver." (An American visitor wrote: "The departure of the coach was always a great event at Valparaisoa crowd of ever-astonished Chilenos assembling every day to witness the phenomenon of one man driving six horses.")

Social recovery

Macmillan writes that this contrastbetween Gage's early, versus later, post-accident behaviorreflects his "[gradual change] from the commonly portrayed impulsive and uninhibited person into one who made a reasonable 'social recovery, citing persons with similar injuries for whom "someone or something gave enough structure to their lives for them to relearn lost social and personal skills":

According to contemporary accounts by visitors to Chile, Gage would have had to

En route (Macmillan continues):

Thus Gage's stagecoach work"a highly structured environment in which clear sequences of tasks were required [but within which] contingencies requiring foresight and planning arose daily"resembles rehabilitation regimens first developed by Soviet neuropsychologist Alexander Luria for the reestablishment of self-regulation in World War II soldiers suffering frontal lobe injuries.

A neurological basis for such recoveries may be found in emerging evidence "that damaged [neural] tracts may re-establish their original connections or build alternative pathways as the brain recovers" from injury. Macmillan adds that if Gage made such a recoveryif he eventually "figured out how to live" (as Fleischman put it) despite his injurythen it "would add to current evidence that rehabilitation can be effective even in difficult and long-standing cases"; and if Gage could achieve such improvement without medical supervision, "what are the limits for those in formal rehabilitation programs?" As author Sam Kean put it, "If even Phineas Gage bounced backthat's a powerful message of hope."

Exaggeration and distortion of mental changes

Macmillan's analysis of scientific and popular accounts of Gage found that they almost always distort and exaggerate his behavioral changes well beyond anything described by anyone who had direct contact with him, concluding that the known facts are "inconsistent with the common view of Gage as a boastful, brawling, foul-mouthed, dishonest useless drifter, unable to hold down a job, who died penniless in an institution". In the words of Barker, "As years passed, the case took on a life of its own, accruing novel additions to Gage's story without any factual basis". Even today (writes Zbigniew Kotowicz) "Most commentators still rely on hearsay and accept what others have said about Gage, namely, that after the accident he became a psychopath"; Grafman has written that "the details of [Gage's] social cognitive impairment have occasionally been inferred or even embellished to suit the enthusiasm of the story teller";
and Goldenberg calls Gage "a (nearly) blank sheet upon which authors can write stories which illustrate their theories and entertain the public".

For example, Harlow's statement that Gage "continued to work in various places; could not do much, changing often, and always finding something that did not suit him in every place he tried" refers only to Gage's final months, after convulsions had set in. But it has been misinterpreted as meaning that Gage never held a regular job after his accident, "was prone to quit in a capricious fit or be let go because of poor discipline", "never returned to a fully independent existence", "spent the rest of his life living miserably off the charity of others and traveling around the country as a sideshow freak", and ("dependent on his family" or "in the custody of his parents") died "in careless dissipation". In fact, after his initial post-recovery months spent traveling and exhibiting, Gage supported himselfat a total of just two different jobsfrom early 1851 until just before his death in 1860.

Other behaviors ascribed, by various authors, to the post-accident Gage that are either unsupported by, or in contradiction to, the known facts include the following:

None of these behaviors are mentioned by anyone who had met Gage or even his family,
and as Kotowicz put it, "Harlow does not report a single act that Gage should have been ashamed of." Gage is "a great story for illustrating the need to go back to original sources", writes Macmillan, most authors having been "content to summarize or paraphrase accounts that are already seriously in error".

Nonetheless (write Daffner and Searl) "the telling of [Gage's] story has increased interest in understanding the enigmatic role that the frontal lobes play in behavior and personality", and Ratiu has said that in teaching about the frontal lobes, an anecdote about Gage is like an "ace [up] your sleeve. It's just like whenever you talk about the French Revolution you talk about the guillotine, because it's so cool."
Benderly suggests that instructors use the Gage case to illustrate the importance of critical thinking.

Extent of brain damage

 

In addition, Ratiu et al. noted that the hole in the base of the cranium (created as the tamping iron passed through the sphenoidal sinus into the brain) has a diameter about half that of the iron itself; combining this with the hairline fracture beginning behind the exit region and running down the front of the skull, they concluded that the skull "hinged" open as the iron entered from below, then was pulled closed by the resilience of soft tissues once the iron had exited through the top of the head.

Van Horn et al. concluded that damage to Gage's white matter (of which they made detailed estimates) was as or more significant to Gage's mental changes than cerebral cortex (gray matter) damage. Thiebaut de Schotten et al. estimated white-matter damage in Gage and two other case studies ("Tan" and "H.M."), concluding that these patients "suggest that social behavior, language, and memory depend on the coordinated activity of different [brain] regions rather than single areas in the frontal or temporal lobes."

Factors favoring Gage's survival

Harlow saw Gage's survival as demonstrating "the wonderful resources of the system in enduring the shock and in overcoming the effects of so frightful a lesion, and as a beautiful display of the recuperative powers of nature", and listed what he saw as the circumstances favoring it:

For Harlow's description of the pre-accident Gage, see § Background, above.

Despite its very large diameter and mass (compared to a weapon-fired projectile) the tamping iron's relatively low velocity drastically reduced the energy available to compressive and concussive "shock waves".

Harlow continued:

Barker writes that "[Head injuries] from falls, horse kicks, and gunfire, were well known in preCivil War America [and] every contemporary course of lectures on surgery described the diagnosis and treatment" of such injuries. But to Gage's benefit, surgeon Joseph Pancoast had performed "his most celebrated operation for head injury before Harlow's medical class,  to drain the pus, resulting in temporary recovery. Unfortunately, symptoms recurred and the patient died. At autopsy, reaccumulated pus was found: granulation tissue had blocked the opening in the dura." By keeping the exit wound open, and elevating Gage's head to encourage drainage from the cranium into the sinuses (through the hole made by the tamping iron), Harlow "had not repeated Professor Pancoast's mistake".

Finally,

Precisely what Harlow's "several reasons" were is unclear, but he was likely referring, at least in part, to the understanding (slowly developing since ancient times) that injuries to the front of the brain are less dangerous than those to the rear, because the latter frequently interrupt vital functions such as breathing and circulation. For example, surgeon James Earle wrote in 1790 that "a great part of the cerebrum may be taken away without destroying the animal, or even depriving it of its faculties, whereas the cerebellum will scarcely admit the smallest injury, without being followed by mortal symptoms."

Ratiu et al. and Van Horn et al. both concluded that the tamping iron passed left of the superior sagittal sinus and left it intact, both because Harlow does not mention loss of cerebrospinal fluid through the nose, and because otherwise Gage would almost certainly have suffered fatal blood loss or air embolism.
Harlow's moderate (in the context of medical practice of the time) use of emetics, purgatives, and (in one instance) bleeding would have "produced dehydration with reduction of intracranial pressure [which] may have favorably influenced the outcome of the case", according to Steegmann.

As to his own role in Gage's survival, Harlow merely averred, "I can only say ... with good old Ambroise Paré, I dressed him, God healed him", but Macmillan calls this self-assessment far too modest. Noting that Harlow had been a "relatively inexperienced local physician ... graduated four and a half years earlier", Macmillan's discussion of Harlow's "skillful and imaginative adaptation [of] conservative and progressive elements from the available therapies to the particular needs posed by Gage's injuries" emphasizes that Harlow "did not apply rigidly what he had learned", for example forgoing an exhaustive search for bone fragments (which risked hemorrhage and further brain injury) and applying caustic to the "fungi" instead of excising them (which risked hemorrhage) or forcing them into the wound (which risked compressing the brain).

Early medical attitudes

Skepticism

 

"A distinguished Professor of Surgery in a distant city", Harlow continued, had even dismissed Gage as a "Yankee invention".

Noting that, "The leading feature of this case is its  This is the sort of accident that happens in the pantomime at the theater, not elsewhere", Bigelow emphasized that though "at first wholly skeptical, I have been personally convinced".

Nonetheless (Bigelow wrote just before Harlow's 1868 presentation of Gage's skull) though "the nature of [Gage's] injury and its reality are now beyond doubt ... Ihave received a letter within a month [purporting] to prove that ... the accident could not have happened."

Standard for other brain injuries

As the reality of Gage's accident and survival gained credence, it became "the standard against which other injuries to the brain were judged", and it has retained that status despite competition from a growing list of other unlikely-sounding brain-injury accidents, including encounters with axes, bolts, low bridges, exploding firearms, a revolver shot to the nose, further tamping irons, and falling Eucalyptus branches.
For example, after a miner survived traversal of his skull by a gas pipe  in diameter (extracted "not without considerable difficulty and force, owing to a bend in the portion of the rod in his skull") his physician invoked Gage as the "only case comparable with this, in the amount of brain injury, that I have seen reported".

Often these comparisons carried hints of humor, competitiveness, or both. The Boston Medical and Surgical Journal, for example, alluded to Gage's astonishing survival by referring to him as "the patient whose cerebral organism had been comparatively so little disturbed by its abrupt and intrusive visitor"; and a Kentucky doctor, reporting a patient's survival of a gunshot through the nose, bragged, "If you Yankees can send a tamping bar through a fellow's brain and not kill him, I guess there are not many can shoot a bullet between a man's mouth and his brains, stopping just short of the medulla oblongata, and not touch either."
Similarly, when a lumbermill foreman returned to work soon after a saw cut  into his skull from just between the eyes to behind the top of his head, his surgeon (who had removed from this wound "thirty-two pieces of bone, together with considerable sawdust") termed the case "second to none reported, save the famous tamping-iron case of Dr. Harlow", though apologizing that "I cannot well gratify the desire of my professional brethren to possess [the patient's] skull, until he has no further use for it himself."

As these and other remarkable brain-injury survivals accumulated, the Boston Medical and Surgical Journal pretended to wonder whether the brain has any function at all: "Since the antics of iron bars, gas pipes, and the like skepticism is discomfitted, and dares not utter itself. Brains do not seem to be of much account now-a-days." The Transactions of the Vermont Medical Society was similarly facetious: The times have been,' says Macbeth , 'that when the brains were out the man would die. But now they rise again.' Quite possibly we shall soon hear that some German professor is exsecting it."

Theoretical misuse

Though Gage is considered the "index case for personality change due to frontal lobe damage", the uncertain extent of his brain damage and the limited understanding of his behavioral changes render him "of more historical than neurologic [sic] interest". Thus, Macmillan writes, "Phineas' story is [primarily] worth remembering because it illustrates how easily a small stock of facts becomes transformed into popular and scientific myth", the paucity of evidence having allowed "the fitting of almost any theory [desired] to the small number of facts we have". A similar concern was expressed as early as 1877, when British neurologist David Ferrier (writing to Harvard's Henry Pickering Bowditch in an attempt "to have this case definitely settled") complained that, "In investigating reports on diseases and injuries of the brain, I am constantly being amazed at the inexactitude and distortion to which they are subject by men who have some pet theory to support. The facts suffer so frightfully ..."
More recently, neurologist Oliver Sacks refers to the "interpretations and misinterpretations [of Gage] from 1848 to the present",
and Jarrett discusses the use of Gage to promote "the myth, found in hundreds of psychology and neuroscience textbooks, plays, films, poems, and YouTube skits[:] Personality is located in the frontal lobes... and once those are damaged, a person is changed forever."

Cerebral localization

In the 19th-century debate over whether the various mental functions are or are not localized in specific regions of the brain , both sides managed to enlist Gage in support of their theories. For example, after Eugene Dupuy wrote that Gage proved that the brain is not localized (characterizing him as a "striking case of destruction of the so-called speech centre without consequent aphasia") Ferrier replied by using Gage (along with the woodcuts of his skull and tamping iron from Harlow's 1868 paper) to support his thesis that the brain is localized.

Phrenology

Throughout the 19th century, adherents of phrenology contended that Gage's mental changes (his profanity, for example) stemmed from destruction of his mental "organ of Benevolence"as phrenologists saw it, the part of the brain responsible for "goodness, benevolence, the gentle character ... [and] to dispose man to conduct himself in a manner conformed to the maintenance of social order"and/or the adjacent "organ of Veneration"related to religion and God, and respect for peers and those in authority. (Phrenology held that the organs of the "grosser and more animal passions are near the base of the brain; literally the lowest and nearest the animal man [while] highest and farthest from the sensual are the moral and religions feelings, as if to be nearest heaven". Thus Veneration and Benevolence are at the apex of the skullthe region of exit of Gage's tamping iron.)

Harlow wrote that Gage, during his convalescence, did not "estimate size or money accurately[,] would not take $1000 for a few pebbles" and was not particular about prices when visiting a local store; by these examples Harlow may have been implying damage to phrenology's "Organ of Comparison".

Psychosurgery and lobotomy

It is frequently asserted that what happened to Gage played a role in the later development of various forms of psychosurgeryparticularly lobotomyor even that Gage's accident constituted "the first lobotomy". Aside from the question of why the unpleasant changes usually (if hyperbolically) attributed to Gage would inspire surgical imitation, there is no such link, according to Macmillan:

Somatic marker hypothesis

Antonio Damasio, in support of his somatic marker hypothesis (relating decision-making to emotions and their biological underpinnings), draws parallels between behaviors he ascribes to Gage and those of modern patients with damage to the orbitofrontal cortex and amygdala. But Damasio's depiction of Gage has been severely criticized, for example by Kotowicz:

As Kihlstrom put it, "[M]any modern commentators exaggerate the extent of Gage's personality change, perhaps engaging in a kind of retrospective reconstruction based on what we now know, or think we do, about the role of the frontal cortex in self-regulation."
Macmillan gives detailed criticism of Antonio Damasio's various presentations of Gage (some of which are joint work with Hannah Damasio and others).

Portraits

Two daguerreotype portraits of Gage, identified in 2009 and 2010, are the only  of him known other than a plaster head cast taken for Bigelow in late 1849 (and now in the Warren Museum along with Gage's skull and tamping iron).
The first portrait shows a "disfigured yet still-handsome" Gage with left eye closed and scars clearly visible, "well dressed and confident, even proud" and holding his iron, on which portions of its inscription can be made out. (For decades the portrait's owners had believed that it depicted an injured whaler with his harpoon.)
The second portrait, copies of which are in the possession of two branches of the Gage family, shows Gage in a somewhat different pose wearing the same waistcoat and possibly the same jacket, but with a different shirt and tie.

Authenticity of the portraits was confirmed by overlaying the inscription on the tamping iron, as seen in the portraits, against that on the actual tamping iron, and matching the subject's injuries to those preserved in the head cast. However, about when, where, and by whom the portraits were taken nothing is known, except that they were created no earlier than January 1850 (when the inscription was added to the tamping iron), on different occasions, and are likely by different photographers.

The portraits support other evidence that Gage's most serious mental changes were temporary . "That [Gage] was any form of vagrant following his injury is belied by these remarkable images", wrote Van Horn et al. "Although just one picture," Kean commented in reference to the first image discovered, "it exploded the common image of Gage as a dirty, disheveled misfit. This Phineas was proud, well-dressed, and disarmingly handsome."

See also

Notes

References
For general readers

For younger readers

For researchers and specialists

Other sources cited

External links

 Phineas Gage information page by the Center for the History of Psychology at the University of Akron
Case of Phineas Gage at the Center for the History of Medicine
Skull, life cast, and tamping iron of Phineas Gage at the Warren Anatomical Museum of the Harvard Medical School
Skull of Phineas Gage at the National Institutes of Health 3D print exchange

1823 births
1860 deaths
American builders
American expatriates in Chile
American people in rail transportation
Burials at Cypress Lawn Memorial Park
Deaths from epilepsy
Frontal lobe
History of neuroscience
Index cases
People from Grafton County, New Hampshire
People from Windsor County, Vermont
People with ptosis (eyelid)
People with traumatic brain injuries
Burials at Laurel Hill Cemetery (San Francisco)